Seven male athletes from Thailand competed at the 1996 Summer Paralympics in Atlanta, United States. Two men won bronze medals for their country.

Medallists

See also
Thailand at the Paralympics
Thailand at the 1996 Summer Olympics

References 

Nations at the 1996 Summer Paralympics
1996
Summer Paralympics